Archana Soreng (born 1996) is an environmental activist belonging to the indigenous Kharia Tribe from Bihabandh Village of Rajgangpur in Sundergarh, Odisha, India. She has been working for awareness about climate change and documentation, preservation, and promotion of the traditional knowledge and practices of indigenous communities.

Soreng has been selected as one of the seven members of Youth Advisory Group on Climate Change established by the Secretary-General of the United Nations as a part of UN Youth Strategy.

Background 
Soregn is from the Khadia Tribe and grew up in Rajgangpur in Odisha's Sundargarh district. She first began to get involved in activism after her father's death. Throughout her life she has been active in the Indian Catholic Youth Movement.

She is also the former president of the TISS students' union. She is also the former National Convener of Tribal Commission also known as Adivasi Yuva Chetna Manch one of the thrust areas of All India Catholic University Federation (AICUF).  Currently, she is working as a research officer at Vasundhara Odisha. Vasundhara is an action research and policy advocacy organisation in Bhubaneswar working on natural resource governance, tribal rights, and climate justice.

References 

Indian women environmentalists
Living people
1996 births
People from Sundergarh district